Stearin , or tristearin, or glyceryl tristearate is an odourless, white powder. It is a triglyceride derived from three units of stearic acid. Most triglycerides are derived from at least two and more commonly three different fatty acids. Like other triglycerides, stearin can crystallise in three polymorphs.

Note that stearin is also used to mean the solid component of an oil or fat that can be separated into components that melt at higher (the stearin) and lower (the olein) temperatures. This is the usage meant in an example such as palm stearin.

Occurrence 
Stearin is obtained from animal fats created as a byproduct of processing beef. It can also be found in tropical plants such as palm. It can be partially purified by dry fractionation by pressing tallow or other fatty mixtures, leading to separation of the higher melting stearin-rich material from the liquid, which is typically enriched in fats derived from oleic acid. It can be obtained by interesterification, again exploiting its higher melting point which allows the higher melting tristearin to be removed from the equilibrated mixture.  Stearin is a side product obtained during the extraction of cod liver oil removed during the chilling process at temperatures below .

Uses 
Stearin is used as a hardening agent in the manufacture of candles and soap.  It is mixed with a sodium hydroxide solution in water, creating a  reaction which gives glycerin and sodium stearate, the main ingredient in most soap:

C3H5(C18H35O2)3 + 3 NaOH → C3H5(OH)3 + 3 C18H35OONa

Stearin is also added to aluminium flakes to help in the grinding process in making dark aluminium powder.

See also
Candle
Michel Eugène Chevreul
Soap making
Stearic acid

References 

Animal fat products
Triglycerides
Stearate esters